Yuliya Ratkevich (Łacinka: Julija Mikałajeŭna Ratkievič; born 16 July 1985) is a Belarusian-born Azerbaijani female wrestler. She is the 2012 Olympic bronze medalist in women's freestyle 55 kg. Early in her career, she competed for Belarus.

Career 
Representing Belarus, Ratkevich won bronze in the 59 kg category at the 2005 European Championships in Varna. After switching to Azerbaijan, she won gold at the 2009 World Championships in Herning and at the 2011 European Championships in Dortmund.

Ratkevich competed in women's freestyle 55 kg at the 2012 Summer Olympics in London. She beat Maria Prevolaraki of Greece in the round of 16, but lost to Saori Yoshida in the next round. Ratkevich thus qualified for the repechage round where she beat American wrestler Kelsey Campbell. In the bronze medal final, she beat Valeria Zholobova from Russia.

Ratkevich also competed in women's freestyle 58 kg at the 2016 Summer Olympics in Rio de Janeiro, Brazil. She lost to Tunisia's Marwa Amri in the bronze medal round.

References

External links
 bio on fila-wrestling.com

Living people
1985 births
Sportspeople from Minsk
Belarusian emigrants to Azerbaijan
Naturalized citizens of Azerbaijan
Azerbaijani female sport wrestlers
Belarusian female sport wrestlers
Wrestlers at the 2012 Summer Olympics
Wrestlers at the 2016 Summer Olympics
Olympic bronze medalists for Azerbaijan
Olympic wrestlers of Azerbaijan
Olympic medalists in wrestling
Medalists at the 2012 Summer Olympics
Wrestlers at the 2015 European Games
European Games competitors for Azerbaijan
World Wrestling Championships medalists
Universiade medalists in wrestling
Universiade gold medalists for Azerbaijan
European Wrestling Championships medalists
Medalists at the 2013 Summer Universiade